"Hold My Body Tight" is a song by English boyband East 17, released in 1995 as the fifth single from their second album, Steam (1994). It followed "Around The World", "Steam", "Stay Another Day" and "Let It Rain" into the UK Singles Chart, but was the only single from the album not to make the UK Top 10, peaking at No. 12. Additionally, it was a top 10 hit in Ireland, Japan and Lithuania, while peaking within the top 20 also in the Netherlands and Scotland.

Critical reception
Pan-European magazine Music & Media commented, "Everybody can see that daily push-ups keep these guys fitter than any Olympic sportsman. If that's not proof enough of their stamina, check out the vitality radiating from the hot swingbeat track off Steam." Alan Jones from Music Week described it as "a softly smacking mid-tempo groove", adding that "far from their most melodic song, it is nicely harmonised, but a little bland. Definitely not the one to put them back at number one." James Hamilton from the RM Dance Update declared it as a "plaintive jackswing jiggler".

Track listings

 CD maxi
 "Hold My Body Tight" (7" radio edit) – 3:37
 "Hold My Body Tight" (Tony Mortimer remix) – 3:40
 "Hold My Body Tight" (Danny Tenaglia vocal mix) – 7:57
 "Hold My Body Tight" (Delta house of funk mix) – 4:44

 12" maxi
 "Hold My Body Tight" (Tony Mortimer remix) – 3:40
 "Stay Another Day" (aphrodite mix) – 5:28
 "Hold My Body Tight" (Danny Tenaglia vocal mix) – 7:58
 "Hold My Body Tight" (Brian Harvey remix) – 4:16

 2 x 12" maxi - Promo
 "Hold My Body Tight" (Danny Tenaglia house mix) – 7:57
 "Hold My Body Tight" (Danny Tenaglia edit) – 3:20
 "Hold My Body Tight" (Lenny B's classic vocal mix) – 8:08
 "Hold My Body Tight" (DJ Casanova's palladium mix) – 6:39
 "Hold My Body Tight" (Tony Mortimer mix) – 3:40
 "Hold My Body Tight" (Danny Tenaglia house dub) – 8:15
 "Hold My Body Tight" (Danny Tenaglia mad drums) – 5:00

Charts

References

1995 singles
East 17 songs
Songs written by Tony Mortimer
Songs written by Richard Stannard (songwriter)
Song recordings produced by Phil Harding (producer)
Songs written by Matt Rowe (songwriter)